Sakri is a Town/tehsil in Sakri Taluka of Dhule District of Maharashtra state in India. Headquarters for the taluka is the town of Sakri. In Sakri Taluka there is a large town named Pimpalner that has historical importance. Pimpalner hosts a religious fair in the name of Khandoji Maharaj, every year during the time of the Ganesh Festival in the month of Bhadra. Pimpalner is located alongside the Panzara River, which is the lifeline of Dhule District.

Places of interest
Important temples:
The shrine is dedicated to Lord Vishnu or Kanhaiyalal Maharaj. 
 Balsane and Mangiji-Tungiji are two prominent Jain pilgrim centers very close to Sakri.
 In the village of Balsane, there are some well preserved caves, Mata Kanbai (Kandevi) Temple and Jain Swami Vimalnath temple.
There are temples (Brahma, Vishnu, Dasavatara) and mat on the banks of the Burai river. The biggest is Mahadeva temple.
Dhandai Devi Manal was awarded with "Maharashtra Rajya Chatrapati Shivaji Maharaj Vanasri Purskar"

Others places:
 The Panzara Kan Sahakari sugar mill is near the town of Sakri. 
 Panzara Dam 
 Akkalpada Dam 
 In Bhamer there is an 
 old fort
 a series of monk's dwellings built into an escarpment.

Education:

Adarsh Madhyamik Vidyalaya, Sakri

S.G.Patil College, Sakri

New English School, Sakri.

Karmvir A. M. Patil Secondary And Higher Secondary College, Pimpalner.

Geography
Part of Sakri Taluka is in the Western Ghats, and 35.27% of the taluka is forested.

National Highway 6(which is now Asian Highway 46) is the major highway passes through the taluka. 

Sakri is the biggest Tehsil in Maharashtra by area with 2 towns and 225 villages, also is the tehsil with most no.of villages.

Sakri Taluka is one of the largest taluka as per area in Maharashtra state. It has the highest number of villages than all other talukas in Maharashtra state.

It is divided into four regions by local people.

 Malmatha region ( माळमाथा परिसर )
 Panzara-Kan region ( पांझरा- कान परिसर )
 Katwan region ( काटवान परिसर )
 Kokan region ( कोकण परिसर )

Villages
Sakri Tehsil has eight revenue circles with 225 revenue villages, most quite small.  

Many tribes live in those villages including Kokna, Mavachi, Bhill and Vanjari.

Demographics
The people in Sakri Taluka are mostly Hindu. The languages most spoken there are Marathi and Ahirani.

References

Talukas in Maharashtra
Dhule district